The Socialist Party of Aotearoa was a minor political party in New Zealand. It was formed in 1990 through a split in the Socialist Unity Party, led by G. H. (Bill) Andersen. The last known leader of the party was Brendan Tuohy.

The party published a monthly newspaper called Red Flag. Its former members continue to operate the Workers' Institute of Scientific Socialist Education (WISSE).

The party is best known through the influence of its late founder Bill Andersen, a well-known trade unionist who served as president of the Auckland Trades Council, national secretary of the Socialist Unity Party, and president of the National Distribution Union.

It did not stand any candidates at the 2014 election.

See also

Communism
List of Communist Parties
Politics of New Zealand
Socialist Unity Party of New Zealand
Communist Party of New Zealand
Workers Party of New Zealand

References

External links 
Socialist Party of Aotearoa 
Workers' Institute of Scientific Socialist Education 

Political parties established in 1990
Communist parties in New Zealand
1990 establishments in New Zealand